Tanus may refer to:

 Tanus, Tarn, France
 Tanus (Crete), a town of ancient Crete

People with the surname
 Jonatan Tanus (born 1995), Finnish ice hockey player
 Sari Tanus (born 1964), Finnish doctor and politician

See also
 Tanu (disambiguation)
 Tanos (river), Peloponnese, Greece
 Taunus (disambiguation)